Arctodus is an extinct genus of short-faced bear that inhabited North America during the Pleistocene (~2.5 Mya until 12,000 years ago). There are two recognized species: the lesser short-faced bear (Arctodus pristinus) and the giant short-faced bear (Arctodus simus), also known as the bulldog bear. Both species are relatively rare in the fossil record. A. pristinus was largely restricted to the Early Pleistocene of the eastern United States, whereas A. simus had a broader range, with most finds being from the Late Pleistocene of the US, Mexico and Canada. A. simus evolved from A. pristinus, but both species likely overlapped in the Middle Pleistocene. Of these species, A. simus was larger, is known from more complete remains, and is considered one of the most charismatic of North America's megafauna.

Today considered to be an enormous omnivore, Arctodus simus is believed to be one of the largest known terrestrial mammalian carnivorans that has ever existed. However, Arctodus, like other bears, was highly sexually dimorphic. Adult A. simus ranged between 300 kg to 950 kg, with females clustering at ≤500 kg, and males around 800 kg. The largest males stood at 1.6 meters at the shoulder, and up to 4 meters tall on their rear legs. Studies suggest that Arctodus simus both browsed on vegetation and consumed browsing herbivores, such as deer, camelids, and tapir. A. simus seems to have preferred open woodlands, but was an adaptable species, taking advantage of many habitats and feeding opportunities.

Arctodus belongs to the Tremarctinae subfamily of bears, which are endemic to the Americas. Of these short-faced bears, Arctodus was the most widespread in North America. However, both species went extinct in the Pleistocene. A. pristinus went extinct around 300,000 years ago, with A. simus disappearing ~12,000 years ago in the Quaternary extinction event, being one of the last recorded megafauna to go extinct in North America. The cause behind these extinctions is unclear, but in the case of A. pristinus, this was likely due to climate change and competition with other ursids, such as the black bear and Tremarctos floridanus. A. simus likely went extinct due to ecological collapse disrupting the vegetation and prey it relied on.

Taxonomy

Arctodus was first described by Joseph Leidy in 1854, with finds of A. pristinus from the Ashley Phosphate Beds, South Carolina. The scientific name of the genus, Arctodus, derives from Greek, and means "bear tooth". The first fossils of A. simus were found in the Potter Creek Cave, Shasta County, California, by J. A. Richardson in 1878, and were described by Edward Drinker Cope in 1879. The most nearly complete skeleton of A. simus found in the US was unearthed in Fulton County, Indiana; the original bones are in the Field Museum of Natural History, Chicago.

In the 19th and early 20th centuries, specimens of Arctodus were occasionally referred to Arctotherium, and vice versa. However, today neither genera are considered to have overlapped, with the closest point of contact being México; the giant Arctodus simus in Valsequillo, Puebla, and the smaller Arctotherium wingei in the Yucatán Peninsula. Conversely, fossils of Arctodus pristinus are often confused with the similarly sized, partially contemporaneous short-faced bear, Tremarctos floridanus. Sometimes described as the "American cave bear", Arctodus should not be mistaken for the similarly large Eurasian cave bear (Ursus spelaeus). As an ursine, the Eurasian cave bear last shared a common ancestor with the tremarctine Arctodus circa 13.4 million years ago.

Evolution

Arctodus belongs to the subfamily Tremarctinae, which appeared in North America during the earliest parts of the late Miocene epoch in the form of Plionarctos, a genus considered ancestral to Tremarctinae. Plionarctos gave way to the medium-sized Arctodus pristinus, Tremarctos floridanus and Arctotherium sp. in the Blancan age of North America, with the genetic divergence date for Arctodus being ~5.5 million years ago. Both Arctodus and Tremarctos were largely restricted to the more forested eastern part of the continent, as Borophagus and Agriotherium are thought to have limited tremarctine presence in the more open Western North America. Tremarctos floridanus established a range mostly hugging the Gulf Coast (but also extending to California, Idaho and Belize), whereas Arctodus pristinus ranged from Aguascalientes, Mexico, to Port Kennedy, Pennsylvania, in the US. Perhaps due to their evolutionary history, both Tremarctos floridanus and Arctodus pristinus have the greatest concentration of fossils in Florida- A. pristinus is first known from the Santa Fe River 1 site of Gilchrist County. However, in the early Quaternary, when both Borophagus and Agriotherium went extinct, Arctodus would take advantage and spread into the rest of the continent, primarily in the form of A. simus. Concurrently, during the Great American Interchange that followed the joining of North and South America, the Central American based Arctotherium invaded South America, leading to the diversification of the genus, including the colossal Arctotherium angustidens.

During the early Irvingtonian (~1.1 million years ago), the smaller A. pristinus was joined by the enormous A. simus. The two are differentiated not only by size, but also by the shorter snout, more robust teeth and longer limbs of A. simus, and the relative proportions of each species' molars and premolars. However, there are relatively few morphological differences. As a result, differentiating Arcotdus simus from Arctodus pristinus can be difficult, as large individuals of Arctodus pristinus can overlap in size with small individuals of Arctodus simus. A. simus is first recorded from the Irvington type locality in California. Although both species co-existed for at least half a million years (A. pristinus went extinct ~300,000 BP), there is no direct evidence of sympatry or competition in the fossil record as of yet. However, there are unreliable records of A. pristinus in South Carolina, California and Florida in the Late Pleistocene, suggesting a possible existence as a relict species in refugia until the Quaternary extinction event. Likewise, Arctodus simus is relatively poorly known from the Irvingtonian (1,900,000 BP-250,000 BP) with finds mostly from California, with additional remains from Texas, Kansas, Nebraska, and Montana. In any case, whereas A. pristinus seems to have preferred the more heavily forested thermal enclave in eastern North America, A. simus was a cosmopolitan, eventually pan-continental species in the Late Pleistocene- sharing that distinction with the black bear, and the brown bear after 100,000 BP.

Primarily inhabiting a range from southern Canada to Central Mexico in the west, to Pennsylvania and Florida in the east, A. simus is particularly famous from fossils found in the La Brea Tar Pits in southern California. From ~50,000 BP to ~23,000 BP, A. simus also inhabited Beringia- finds today span from northern Alaska to the Yukon. The Late Pleistocene represents the peak of ursid diversity in Quaternary North America, with Arctodus simus, brown bears, black bears, Tremarctos floridanus, and Arctotherium wingei all roaming south of the Laurentide Ice Sheet, and polar bears above the ice. However, despite Arctodus simus''' large temporal and geographic range, fossil remains are comparatively rare (109 finds as of 2010, in otherwise well-sampled localities).

 Genetic diversity 
An examination of mitochondrial DNA sequenced from specimens of Arctodus simus from Alaska, Yukon, Alberta and Ohio suggest an extremely low level of genetic diversity among the 23 individuals studied (≤ 44,000 14C BP), with only seven haplotypes recovered, forming a monophyletic clade. Genetic diversity was comparable to modern endangered taxa, such as the brown kiwi and African cheetah. Explanations include a genetic bottleneck before 44,000 14C BP, or a low level of genetic diversity being a feature of a species which was primarily solitary, with a large home range and relatively small population size. However, a similar lack of genetic diversity across large geographic areas can be found in some hyenas in Africa, such as the striped hyena and brown hyena. However, this does not entirely preclude genetic diversity in Arctodus simus, with genetic samples from Chiquihuite cave, Mexico (~14,000 BP), indicating a deep divergence with previously studied specimens of A. simus.

Description
 Size 
Both species of Arctodus show pronounced intraspecific variation. Much of this variation is related to sexual dimorphism, with smaller, more lightly built females and larger, massive males.

 Arctodus pristinus A. pristinus specimens closely overlap the size of Tremarctos floridanus, with the some males of A. pristinus overlapping in size with the females of A. simus. A. pristinus individuals recovered from the Leisey Shell Pit were calculated to an average of ~133 kg.

 Arctodus simus 
Some A. simus individuals might have been the largest land-dwelling specimens of Carnivora that ever lived in North America. There is much variation in adult size among specimens- the paucity of finds, sexual dimorphism and potentially ecomorphs could be augmenting the average size of Arctodus. The largest recorded individuals from the La Brea Tar Pits are much smaller than most specimens from Alaska, Utah and Nebraska. This has been suggested as an ecomorphological difference (e.g. the La Brea specimens have a size variation of 25%, as could be expected with ursid sexual dimorphism), if not subspecies, with A. s. yukonensis inhabiting the northern and central portions of its range, and A. s. simus occurring elsewhere. Once again, the low number of specimens and sex-biased sampling put doubt on this designation, in addition finds revealing an Arctodus simus individual well within the size range of A. s. yukonensis in Florida (deep within the supposed range of A. s. simus), and the reverse being found in the Yukon. A high degree of sexual dimorphism, along with morphological diversity likely due to geographic and temporal variation, has also been noted from A. pristinus specimens from Florida.

Though over 100 giant short-faced bear localities in North America are known, only one site produced a baculum (penis bone) that could belong to Arctodus simus. The lack of recovered Arctodus bacula likely reflects both taphonomy and behaviour. The majority of skeletal remains representing large individuals are from open sites where usually only a few elements were recovered. In contrast, horizontal (walk-in) cave passages produced numerous examples of small, yet relatively complete individuals where bacula would likely be found if they had been present. Both the small size of recovered skeletal elements and the lack of bacula from cave deposits suggest that female individuals of A. simus were using caves, in line with ursid maternal denning. Therefore, in conjunction with ursid sexual dimorphism (e.g. in spectacled bears, males are 30%-40% larger than females), the largest individuals are often considered male, particularly older males, with the smaller individuals being females.

Hypothetically, the largest individuals of A. simus may have approached , or even . However, a 2006 study argued that based on the dimensions of the axial skeleton of the Arctodus individual with the largest known skull, the maximum size of that Arctodus was ~. Additionally, a 1998 study calculated the average weight of Arctodus specimens from the La Brea Tar Pits at ~, smaller than recovered brown bear remains (~, although these remains postdate Arctodus). A 1999 study by Per Christiansen calculated a mean weight of ~ from six large male A. simus specimens.

Both giant short faced bears Arctodus simus and Arctotherium angustidens reached huge body sizes, in an example of convergent evolution. However, beyond gigantism, there are notable differences between the species. Not only did Arctotherium angustidens reach a higher maximum weight (an exceptional specimen was calculated at ~), A. angustidens was a much more robust animal, in contrast with the gracile Arctodus simus. Within these ranges, the largest specimens of both species are said to be comparable to one another.

 Anatomy 
 Skull 

Members of the Tremarctinae subfamily of bears appear to have a disproportionately short snout compared with most modern bears, giving them the name "short-faced." This apparent shortness is an illusion caused by the deep snouts and short nasal bones of tremarctine bears compared with ursine bears; Arctodus has a deeper but not a shorter face than most living bears. This characteristic is also shared by the only living tremarctine bear, the spectacled bear. Snout deepness could be variable, as  specimens from Huntington Reservoir in Utah, and the Hill-Shuler locality, Texas, were noted as being distinctly "short-faced" in comparison with other Arctodus simus individuals. As with Tremarctos ornatus, specimens with a large sagittal crest were likely male, whereas females had a reduced or no sagittal crest.

The skull also has a wide and shortened rostrum, potentially giving Arctodus a more felid-like appearance; this broad snout possibly housed a highly developed olfactory apparatus, or accommodated a larger throat passage to bolt down large food items, akin to spotted hyenas (although this is characteristic shared with the omni-herbivorous spectacled bear). The orbits of Arctodus are proportionally small compared to the size of the skull, and somewhat laterally orientated (a characteristic of tremarctine bears), more so than actively predatory carnivorans or even the brown bear, suggesting that stereoscopic vision was not a priority.

The premolars and first molars of Arctodus pristinus are relatively smaller and more widely spaced than those of Arctodus simus. However, the morphologies of both species are otherwise very similar. Differentiating between the two can be difficult, as males of A. pristinus overlap in size with females of A. simus. The dentition of Arctodus has been used as evidence of a predatory lifestyle- in particular the large canines, the high-crowned lower first molar, and the possible carnassial shear with the upper fourth premolar. However, the wearing of the molars to a relatively flat, blunt loph (suitable as a crushing platform as per modern omnivorous bears), small shear facet, and the flattened cusps across age ranges (unlike carnivores, which instead have carnassial shears) suggests an alternative adaptive purpose.

In A. pristinus, the features of the dentition can be quite variable, particularly the M2 molar. A specimen of A. simus from the Seale Pit of the Hill-Shuler locality, Texas, with only two premolars, crowding of the anterior premolar out of line, and a wider and shorter muzzle, was even suggested to be an undescribed form of Arctodus.

An analysis of the mandibular morphology of tremarctine bears found that Arctodus pristinus and Arctodus simus were divergent in the dimensions of their cranial anatomy, with Arctodus simus clustering tightly with Arctotherium angustidens, suggesting a similar foraging strategy. A. simus specimens have a concave jaw, large masseter and temporalis muscles, deeper horizontal ramus and a reduced slicing dentition length, when compared to A. pristinus. However, both A. pristinus and A. simus were still found to be comfortably in the "omnivorous" bear cranio-morphotype, and are interpreted as such, along with Arctotherium angustidens.

 Post-cranial 

Although the shape of the elbow joint suggests Arctodus, Arctotherium bonariense, and Arctotherium wingei had the possibility of retaining semi-arboreal adaptations, the size of the elbow joint condemns Arctodus to terrestrial life. As the medial epicondyle is particularly expanded in these species, it is likely that Arctodus and Arctotherium (just like the giant panda) retained this characteristic to attain a higher degree of forelimb dexterity.

The paws (metapodials and phalanges) of Arctodus were characteristically long, slender, and more elongated along the third and fourth digits compared to ursine bears. Arctodus' paws were therefore more symmetrical than ursine bears, whose feet have axes aligned with the most lateral (fifth) digit. Also, the first digit (hallux) of Arctodus was positioned more closely and parallel to the other four digits (i.e. with straight toes, Arctodus had less lateral splaying). This theory is potentially contradicted by trackways tentatively attributed to Arctodus from near Lakeview in Oregon. The trackways, which fit the dimensions of Arctodus simus' paws, exhibit extreme toe splaying, with three centrally aligned, evenly spaced toes at the front, and two almost perpendicular toes (80° from the axis of the foot on either side). The trackways suggest that Arctodus had an oval-shaped, undivided pad on its sole (with no toe pad impressions), with front paws that were slightly larger than its back paws, possessed long claws, and had its hind foot overstep the forefoot when walking, like modern bears. For comparison, the manus of the spectacled bear has five digits arrayed in a shallow arc, and claws which are quite long, and which also extend far in front of their respective digits. Some claw marks attributed to Arctodus simus at Riverbluff Cave (as they were four meters above the floor of the cave) were nearly 20 cm in width.

The presence of a partial false thumb in Arctodus simus is a characteristic shared with Tremarctos floridanus and the spectacled bear, and is possibly an ancestral trait. Absent in ursine bears, the false thumb of the spectacled bear has been suggested to assist in herbivorous food manipulation (such as extracting mast, e.g. bromelaid/palm hearts), or arboreality.

 Locomotion 
Researchers disagree on the locomotive style of Arctodus. Paul Matheus proposed that Arctodus may have moved in a highly efficient, moderate-speed pacing gait, more specialized than modern bears. His research concluded that the large body size, taller front legs, high shoulders, short and sloping back, and long legs of Arctodus also compounded locomotive efficiency, as these traits swelled the amount of usable elastic strain energy in the tendons, and increased stride length, making Arctodus built more for endurance than for great speed. Based on other mammals, the optimal pace speed of Arctodus would have been , which would have also been rather fast for moderate speed travel. For comparison, hyenas cross country ~.

However, a comprehensive 2010 study found that the legs of Arctodus weren't proportionally longer than modern bears would be expected to have, and that bears in general being long-limbed animals is obscured in life by their girth and fur. The study concluded the supposed "long-legged" appearance of the bear is largely an illusion created by the animal's relatively shorter back and torso- proportions today shared with hyenas. In fact, Arctodus probably had an even shorter back than other bears, due the necessary ratio between body length and body mass of the huge bear.

 Maturity 
Examinations on a young individual of Arctodus simus from an Ozark cave suggest that Arctodus, like other ursids, reached sexual maturity before osteological maturity. Comparisons with known epiphyseal fusion sequences in black bears demonstrated that while the individual was not osteologically mature when it died (numerous epiphyses were unfused) the stage of fusion of the long bone epiphyseal plates indicated that the specimen was mostly full sized, and was therefore sexually mature well before such fusions are complete. If Arctodus were similar in their timing of sexual maturity to modern Ursus americanus, then the Arctodus specimen was already sexually mature, and was either 4–6 years of age if female, or 6–8 years if the specimen was male. Additionally, wear patterns on the individual's teeth are similar to a 4-6 year old Ursus americanus.  For comparison, female spectacled bears reach sexual maturity ~4 years of age, female black bears become sexually mature between 2–4 years of age, and female brown bears begin breeding in some portions of their range at around 3 years. Fused sutures and tooth eruption have been used to determine adulthood in Arctodus.

Paleobiology

 Arctodus pristinus 
 Paleoecology 
Although smaller than its descendant, Arctodus pristinus was still a relatively large tremarctine bear. Sometimes referred to as the eastern short-faced bear, A. pristinus has been found in Kansas, South Carolina, Maryland and Pennsylvania in the US, and Aguascalientes in Mexico. A. pristinus is particularly well known from Florida, especially from the Leisey Shell Pit. Like A. simus and other tremarctine bears, A. pristinus had adaptations for herbivory, and was likely largely herbivorous itself.

 Chronology Arctodus pristinus is considered a biochronological indicator for the period between the Late Blancan and late Irvingtonian periods of Pleistocene Florida.

 Competition with other ursids 
In the Early Pleistocene, Arctodus pristinus was much more populous the south-east of North America, whereas the black bear was more common in the north-east. A partially contemporary tremarctine bear inhabiting western North America, Tremarctos floridanus are very similar to A. pristinus in terms of size and skeletal anatomy. A. pristinus can be distinguished by broader and taller molars on average, but as they are often worn, differentiation can be difficult. Despite this, generally speaking large tremarctine fossils from the Early and Middle Pleistocene of Florida are considered to be A. pristinus, whereas those from the Late Pleistocene of Florida are considered to be T. floridanus. Indeed, black bears and Tremarctos floridanus are believed to have only colonised Florida with the extinction of A. pristinus, with T. floridanus possibly being an ecological replacement of A. pristinus. However, T. floridanus could yet still be found from older sites in Florida.

 Hibernation Arctodus pristinus specimens have been found in caves such as Port Kennedy, Pennsylvania (where fossils from as many as 36 individuals have been found), and Cumberland Cave, Maryland, often in association with the black bear. This suggests a close association with the biome.

 Arctodus simus 
 Paleoecology 

Evolving from the smaller A. pristinus around 1.1 million years ago, scholars today mostly conclude that Arctodus simus was a colossal, opportunistic omnivore, with a flexible, locally adapted diet akin to the brown bear. If Arctodus simus wasn't largely herbivorous, the scavenging of megaherbivore carcasses, and the occasional predatory kill would have complimented the large amounts of vegetation consumed when available. Carbon-13 (δ13C) isotope data gathered from Arctodus specimens from Beringia, California and Mexico, indicates that Arctodus simus had a diet based on C3 resources. Preferring closed habitat (open woodland & forest), Arctodus consumed C3 vegetation (leaves, stems, fruits, bark, and flowers from trees, shrubs, and cool season grasses) and the browsers that fed on them, such as deer, camelids, tapir, bison and ground sloths.

Occasionally referred to as the great short-faced bear, Arctodus simus was particularly plentiful in western North America. Arctodus simus was integral to what has been referred to as the Camelops fauna, or alternatively Camelops/Odocoileus lucasi ("Navahoceros") fauna, a faunal province centered in Western North America. The Camelops fauna was also characterized by shrub-ox, prairie dogs, dwarf pronghorns, Shasta ground sloths, and American lions, although individual species ranges could shift independently of one another. The diverse flora of the Camelops faunal province included montane conifers and oak park lands, shrub and grassland that stretched across the North American Cordillera south of Canada, to the Valley of Mexico. This supported a variety of large grazing and browsing mammals such as mammoth, horses, bison, mastodon, deer, pronghorns and large ground sloths.

As Arctodus has been recovered from a comparatively small number of finds in relation to other large carnivorans, Arctodus is suggested to have lived in low population densities. Typically thought of as an open habitat specialist, Arctodus seems to have also been abundant in mixed habitat where C3 vegetation was available. Based on the wide distribution of the species, Arctodus simus inhabited diverse climatic conditions and all sorts of environments, ranging from boreal forests and mammoth steppe in the north, open plains and highland woodlands in the interior, subtropical woodlands and savannas in the south, to the pine–oak forests of the Trans-Mexican Volcanic Belt, the boundary of the Nearctic realm.

Preliminary data suggests that certain habitat was optimal for Arctodus simus populations- the pluvial lakes, highland forests and arid sagebrush steppe/grassy plains of the inland western USA, the montane woodlands of the US Interior Highlands, paludified mammoth steppe in Beringia, and the mixed savannas of the south-western USA and Mexican Plateau.

 Competition with ursine bears 

Black bears inhabited North America since at least the Middle Pleistocene, whereas brown bears, along with lions, bison and red foxes, first emigrated to North America via Beringia during the Illinoian Glaciation (~170,000 BP). One theory behind the extinction of Arctodus simus is that A. simus may have been out-competed by brown bears as the latter expanded southwards from eastern Beringia, and gradually established itself in North America.

However, this has been refuted by more recent research. A 2018 study explained that on a continent-wide scale, although brown and Arctodus simus were sympatric at times as brown bears spread through North America, Arctodus simus may typically have dominated competitive interactions, particularly when their populations were robust, and displaced brown bears from specific localities. At the end of the Pleistocene one reason brown bears persisted where Arctodus simus went extinct was because Arctodus may have been less flexible in adapting to new and rapidly changing environments that impacted the availability or quality of food and possibly habitat. Brown bears and Arctodus have been discovered together in Alaska (then Beringia) before ∼34,000 BP, and in later Pleistocene deposits in Vancouver Island, Wyoming and Nevada.

 Beringia 
Meat consumption is confirmed by elevated isotope (δ13C and δ15N) values in numerous Beringian late Pleistocene Arctodus simus specimens where these bears may have competed for food, but usually occupied a higher trophic level compared with invading brown bears. For example, inland Beringian brown bears from the late Pleistocene (exception being to specimens from the Yukon) consumed terrestrial vegetation and salmon at similar proportions to modern coastal populations, whereas modern inland populations of northern brown bears showed no signatures associated with significant salmon consumption. In both inland populations of Late Pleistocene Beringian brown bears, reduced signatures of terrestrial meat consumption were noted. On the other hand, data from Beringian specimens of Arctodus suggest that while omnivorous, only terrestrial sources of meat were important for northern Arctodus. This contrast is represented in the data- isotopic data from Beringian Arctodus clusters tightly, and groups differently to Beringian brown bears, although there is overlap.

That Arctodus simus (along with the expansion of peatlands) may have excluded brown bears from Eastern Beringia from ∼34,000 to ∼23,000 BP further suggests that Arctodus may typically have been dominant over brown bears. When Arctodus went extinct in Beringia ~23,000 BP, brown bears recolonised Beringia, but had more carnivorous diets than their Beringian kin pre ~34,000 BP. This bolsters the idea that these bears competed for similar resources and niches. Similarly, while more herbivorous in Beringia while competing with Arctodus, brown bears seem to have been more carnivorous when co-existing with cave bears in Eurasia (Ursus spelaeus). Extinction and repopulation is further evidenced by the high genetic (mitochondrial) diversity of Beringian brown bears between 59,000 BP and 10,000 BP (16 haplotypes from 27 samples) in contrast with Beringian Arctodus simus (7 haplotypes from 23 samples). This contrast in genetic diversity has also been hypothesized to suggest that while brown bears are female philopatric (i.e. females have a permanent home range), Arctodus simus may not have been, at least not to the same extent.

The forcing of a smaller bear into a more herbivorous diet has been compared to the modern relationship between brown bears and American black bears, with the black bears often consuming large amounts of salmon and other higher trophic‐level resources in environments where brown bears are rare or absent. Where they overlap, brown bears are observed to take over the higher trophic niche, create avoidance at the population level and seasonally displacing local black bears. Ultimately, black bears tend to have much lower population densities in areas where brown bears are also present. In locations where these two species coexist today, black bears' territorial ranges are much smaller than the ranges of sympatric brown bears.

 Vancouver Island 
Although a 2018 study hypothesized that both species did not overlap territorially on Vancouver Island, a revision of radiocarbon dates by a 2022 study concluded that brown bears, black bears and Arctodus simus all co-existed on Vancouver Island once the island de-glaciated ~14,500 BP. Noting that all three bears relied on terrestrial resources, the black bears occupied a distinctly lower trophic position in relation to the brown bear, with Arctodus holding an intermediate position according to a compound‐specific stable isotope analysis. However, this may be an underestimate- an analysis δ15N threonine suggests that protein consumption may be higher in Arctodus than the other bear species. This may indicate a differentiation in prey choice within the same trophic level (e.g. insects versus terrestrial, plant‐consuming mammals).

The base differences of δ13C and δ15N values between brown and black bears was narrow, which could be due to the lack of consumption of aquatic resources by the higher trophic level taxa. Although these samples show potential range overlap between species, it is possible that the different taxa were specialized to different environmental settings, which vary greatly across small geographical areas on the mountainous island. The standard differentiation between the more open adapted brown bear and closed forest-adapted black bear is complicated by competition from Arctodus simus, which seems to have preferred more open habitat.

Additionally, the Arctodus specimens from Vancouver Island are believed to be female- that modern female brown bears had significant differences in nitrogen-15 values with male brown bears where they co-exist with black bears, and that very large brown bears may not be able to sustain themselves on a vegetarian diet, could indicate size as a constraint on the level of herbivory possible for short‐faced bears. Correspondingly, a sex‐patterned difference in δ15N values of bear collagen was observed.

 Hibernation 

According to a 2003 study, in karst regions, fossils of Arctodus simus have been recovered almost exclusively from cave sites. In the contiguous United States, 26 of 69 Arctodus simus sites (~38%) are in caves. That greater than one-third of all sites are caves suggests a close association between this species and cave environments. Furthermore, over 70% of the smaller specimens (once assigned as the A. s. simus subspecies) are from cave deposits. Not one of the specimens assigned to the larger morph (A. s. yukonensis) is from a cave passage. Taking into account the fact that female ursids are smaller and more prone to den in caves, it seems logical to conclude that the majority of Arctodus simus from such deposits were females and may have been denning when they perished.

Female specimens of Arctodus simus have been inferred to have been exhibiting maternal denning, however the expression of metabolic denning (hibernation/torpor) is unclear in Arctodus. Moreover, to date, there are no records of adults with associated offspring from caves. However, Arctotherium angustidens, a fellow giant short-faced bear, has recovered from a cave in Argentina with offspring.

Numerous "bear" beds often preserve Arctodus simus and both Pleistocene and modern American black bears in association (U.a. amplidens and U. a. americanus)- such deposits have been found in Missouri, Oklahoma and Potter Creek Cave, California, where 8 individuals of A. simus have been found. These mixed deposits are assumed to have accumulated over time as individual bears (including Arctodus) died during winter sleep. Furthermore, environmental DNA suggests that Arctodus and black bears shared a cave in Chiquihuite cave, Zacatecas.

At the Labor-of-Love cave in Nevada, both American black bears and brown bears have been found in association with Arctodus simus. A study in 1985 noted that sympatry between Arctodus and brown bears preserved in caves is rare, with only Little Box Elder Cave in Wyoming and Fairbanks II site in Alaska hosting similar remains.

 Paleopathology 
Beyond dietary dental pathologies present in the genus, the most nearly complete skeleton of Arctodus preserves extensive pathologies on the skeleton. One hypothesis suggests the Fulton County Arctodus specimen suffered from a syphilis-like (treponemal) disease, or yaws, based on lesions on the vertebrae, ribs and both ulnae. However, alternate hypotheses include tuberculosis, osteomyelitis, arthritis or a fungal infection, either singularly or in combination with other causes. The same individual records a pathological growth distorting the deltoid and pectoral ridges on the right humerus. Furthermore, abscesses are noted between the m1 and m2 of both dentaries, and on both ulna. Hypotheses include syphilis, osteoarthritis, a fungal infection in addition to long term syphilis, or an infected wound.

 Distribution & habitat 

 Map 

 Regional Paleoecology 

 Arctodus pristinus 

 Eastern North America 
More fossils of Arctodus pristinus are known from Florida (about 150) than anywhere else. In the Early Pleistocene of Blancan Florida, the Santa Fe River 1 site (~2.2 Ma), which Arctodus pristinus inhabited, was a fairly open grassland environment, dominated by longleaf pine flatwoods. Karst sinks and springs were present, very much like modern Florida. Arctodus pristinus would have co-existed with megafauna such as terror birds (Titanis), sabertooth cats (Xenosmilus), giant sloth (Eremotherium, Paramylodon, Megalonyx), giant armadillos (Holmesina, Glyptotherium, Pachyarmatherium), gomphotheres (Rhynchotherium (?Cuvieronius?)), hyenas (Chasmoporthetes), canids (Borophagus, Canis lepophagus), peccary (Platygonus), llama (Hemiauchenia), antilocaprids (Capromeryx), and three-toed horse (Nannippus). Smaller fauna included condors, rails and ducks among other small birds, rodents such as porcupines, lizards, snakes, alligators, turtles, and arthropods. The evolution of Arctodus simus, competition with Tremarctos floridanus and black bears (both of which only appear in Florida in the Late Pleistocene), and possibly the transitioning of Pleistocene Florida from a hot, wet, densely forested habitat to a still hot, but drier and much more open biome are thought to be factors behind the gradual disappearance of Arctodus pristinus in the Middle Pleistocene (300,000 BP).

 Arctodus simus 

 Mexico 
Tremarctine bears were dominant in Mexico during the Late Pleistocene, with Arctodus simus and Tremarctos floridanus being plentiful. Arctodus simus was limited to the Mexican plateau, which was generally occupied by tropical thorn scrub and scrub woodland. An Arctodus simus individual from Cedral, San Luis Potosí, inhabited closed vegetation, based on the individual's δ13C signature. Consuming C3 resources, its diet may have incorporated contemporaneous C3 specialists such as tapir, llamas, camels, and Shasta ground sloth, likely along with browsed vegetation. Fauna which visited closed areas at Cedral include Paramylodon, peccaries, some horses, mastodon, and occasionally Glyptotherium, Megalonyx, bison, dire wolves, American lions and Colombian mammoths. The site, incorporating trees, herbs and cacti, hosted an open gallery forest near to grassland or scrub with a humid climate. This forest-savanna mosaic, supporting a diverse mammalian herbivore and carnivore fauna, was part of the wider mesic savanna and piñon–juniper woodland ecoregion which Arctodus inhabited in the Late Pleistocene central Mexico and southwestern USA.

At La Cinta-Portalitos (Michoacán/Guanajuato) in the Trans-Mexican Volcanic Belt, prime habitat for Arctodus simus was the closed temperate forests of the Madrean pine–oak woodlands, dominated by pines, oaks, hornbeams, and ferns (Polypodium & Pecluma). Associated fauna primarily found in this habitat include Sigmodon, Aztlanolagus, ocelots, gray fox, Hemiauchenia, pronghorns (Capromeryx, Stockoceros, Tetrameryx), cottontail rabbits, bobcats, ground sloths (Nothrotheriops, Megalonyx), Smilodon fatalis and Panthera atrox. Today, these high-humidity forests are found between 2500-2800m altitude- however, in the Late Pleistocene, they were found at less than 2000m altitude. Tremarctos floridanus at this locality, on the other hand, inhabited gallery forests and their wetlands, along with white-tailed deer, capybaras, Pampatherium, horses, and Cuvieronius. Similar highland Arctodus simus remains have been recovered from Zacoalco, Valsequillo, and Tequixquiac.

 Western USA 

With over 50% (22/38) of specimens found in the contiguous United States from the terminal Pleistocene (<40,000 BP), the Western USA was highly productive habitat for Arctodus simus. In particular, the Pacific Mountain System seems to represent a cradle of evolution for Arctodus simus. The earliest finds of Arctodus simus are from California, from early and middle Irvingtonian age sites such as Vallecito Creek, Irvington, Riverside, and Fairmead.

Evidence from Inland California suggests that despite the shift to aridified environments from the Early to Late Pleistocene of California (1.1Ma to ~15,000 BP), Arctodus simus remained consistent with the consumption of C3 resources. This period saw the evolution from wetter mixed woodland-grassland and marsh/prairie C3 dominated environs at Irvington and Fairmead, to the more arid, mixed C3-C4 savannas of the McKittrick Tar Pits. Whereas jaguars, Homotherium, Miracinonyx and Smilodon ultimately transitioned to Panthera atrox and coyotes in the local predator guild, only dire wolves and Arctodus simus remained ever present. Foraging opportunities would have been plentiful for Arctodus, with grasses, chenopods, Xanthium, cattails, sedges, willow, oak, spruce, juniper, and sagebrush at Fairmead, and pines, juniper, saltbush, manzanita, and wild cucumber at McKittrick. To what extent Arctodus fed on this vegetation, versus consuming generalists and specialized browsers such as deer (Cervus & Odocoileus), camelids (Hemiauchenia & Camelops), Paramylodon, and peccaries can be clued from the La Brea Tar Pits. Microwear and general wear patterns on the teeth of recovered from Arctodus specimens are most similar to the herbivorous spectacled bear, and suggest that they avoided hard/brittle foods, and had a more specialized diet than black bears recovered from the same site. Should Arctodus have also been a predator, competition with closed habitat, browser specialists would have included Smilodon and Panthera atrox in Late Pleistocene inland California. Many more finds come from across California, and Oregon, where the semi-arid woodland/scrub transitioned to forest-steppe.The Intermontane Plateau, which largely hosted subalpine parkland, had the highest number of Arctodus simus specimens south of the ice sheets. The region has yielded some of the largest specimens of A. simus, including, what was once the largest specimen on record, from Salt Lake Valley, Utah. In contrast with other parts of North America, the plateau received more rainfall during the Late Pleistocene, because glacially cooled air collided with hot desert air, resulting in increased precipitation and cool cloudy conditions. As a result, this greatly expanded the range of woodlands where desert exists today, with pluvial lakes being abundant in the south-west. The mid-Wisconsian U-Bar cave (New Mexico) was populated by fauna typically found in cooler and more mesic habitats, particularly habitats characterized by a notable pulse of cool-season precipitation, relatively warm winters, and limited warm-season moisture. Sagebrush, grasses, and woodland vegetation suggests cooler summers and a more pronounced emphasis on cool-season precipitation than in lowland New Mexico (Dry Cave). This more xeric and warmer climate contrasts with the sagebrush steppe-woodland of the Last Glacial Maximum. Notable fauna which lived alongside Arctodus simus included Shasta ground sloth, shrub-ox, pronghorns (Stockoceros, Capromeryx), Camelops, Odocoileus, horses, Lynx, puma, black bear, mountain goats, prairie dogs, and Stock's vampire bat. Dire wolves were also found in association with Arctodus simus at U-Bar cave, along with Conkling Cavern- both species are the most common carnivorans of Rancholabrean New Mexico. Beyond New Mexico, other important specimens have also been found in Arizona, Idaho, Montana, Nevada, and Utah. The Intermontane Plateau extended deep into Mexico, where it demarked the southernmost habitat of Arctodus simus.Comparatively, the Rocky Mountain System had the fewest number of specimens of Arctodus simus in western North America. However, one of the youngest dated Arctodus simus is from a cave near Huntington Reservoir, Utah, which sits at an elevation of 2,740m (~9,000 ft),. The central and southern Rocky Mountains may have acted as refugia for Arctodus simus, in addition to other contemporary high-elevation alpine fauna such as Colombian mammoths, mastodon, horses, and giant bison ≤11,400 BP (10,000 14C BP). Other remains have been found from Natural Trap Cave and Little Box Elder Cave in Wyoming, and Montana.

 Interior USA 
The Interior Plains were composed of temperate steppe grassland, and among the specimens yielded from this region is one the largest Arctodus simus currently on record, from the banks of the Kansas river. The Irvingtonian age Doeden gravel pits in Montana preserves an open grassland habitat, with riparian woodlands, and likely some shrublands. Arctodus simus co-existed with ground sloths (Megalonyx, Paramylodon), Pacific mastodon, camels, and oxen (Bootherium). As bison were yet to migrate into North America, Colombian mammoths and horses dominated these Sangamonian grasslands. Additional Irvingtonian remains have been recovered from Arkalon in Kansas, Hay Springs in Nebraska, and Rock Creek in Texas.Whereas the northern plains aridified into cold steppe in the Rancholabrean age (e.g. Mammoth site, South Dakota), the southern plains were a parkland with riparian deciduous forests (e.g. hackberry), and large expanses of mixed grass prairie grasslands grading into wet meadows. At Lubbock Lake on the Llano Estacado, Texas, above freezing/mild winters and cool summers highlighted a regional climate of reduced seasonality and stable humidity in the latest Pleistocene. Overall, Arctodus simus, grey wolves and coyotes were part of a predator guild throughout the Rancholabrean great plains, and were joined by Colombian mammoths, camels, Hemiauchenia, and American pronghorns. In the northern plains, woolly mammoths also ranged across the steppe, whereas in the south, Smilodon, dire wolves, grey fox and red fox in the south preyed upon horses prairie dogs, horses (Equus & Haringtonhippus), peccaries, Odocoileus, Capromeryx, Bison antiquus and Holmesina. Beyond Texas, Arctodus has also been found from the Kaw River and Jinglebob in Kansas.

In the lowlands in the eastern Interior plains, the plains transitioned to closed habitat. At the terminal Pleistocene Sheriden Cave, Ohio, a mosaic habitat consisting of marsh, open woodland, and patchy grassland was home to Arctodus simus, Cervalces scotti, caribou, peccaries (Platygonus, Mylohyus), giant beaver, porcupine, and American pine marten. Similar remains have been found in Indiana and Iowa.

To the south, the Interior Highlands had a very high density of Arctodus simus specimens (second only to the black bear), due to the high rate of preservation in the cave-rich region. Sympatry between the two species is most apparent in Missouri- Arctodus simus has been found in association with black bears at Riverbluff, Bat and Big Bear caves. At Riverbluff Cave, the most abundant claw marks are from Arctodus simus. Some being up to 4 meters high on the cave walls, they are most abundant at the bear beds and their associated passageways, indicating a close relationship with denning. Other impressions found include claw marks from a large cat (either Panthera atrox or Smilodon fatalis) and Platygonus trackways. Big Bear Cave preserves fossilized hair associated with Arctodus. During the Last Glacial Maximum, both bears were joined by dire wolves, coyotes, jaguars, snowshoe hare, groundhogs and beavers at Bat Cave, which also records thousands of Platygonus remains. These fauna inhabited well-watered forest-grassland ecotone with a strong taiga influence. These open woodlands were dominated by pines and spruce, and to a lesser extent by oaks. However, evidence from Riverbluff Cave suggests that the region occasionally cycled through drier, grassier periods in the last 55,000 years.

 Eastern USA 
Compared to other regions, Arctodus simus was relatively rare in eastern North America. To the north, the Appalachian Highlands were dominated by taiga. Post-LGM Saltville, Virginia, was a mosaic of grassy/herb laden open areas intermixed with open canopy boreal woodlands (oaks, pines, spruce, birch, firs) and marshes. Inhabiting in this C3 resource dominated environment were Arctodus simus, mastodon, (southernmost) woolly mammoths, oxen (Bootherium), horses, caribou, ground sloths (Megalonyx), dire wolves, beavers, Cervalces, and a variety of warm-adapted reptiles, suggesting that a more mesic and less seasonal climate allowed for the mixing of more typically northern and southern fauna. Heavy bone damage on a mammoth carcass by both dire wolves and Arctodus suggests a potentially competitive scavenging relationship  Additional remains have been found at Island Ford Cave in Virginia, and Frankstown in Pennsylvania.

To the south, the Atlantic Plains covered a great expanse of lowland, from the open deciduous woodlands of the Atlantic coast, to the semi-arid woodland/scrub of Florida, to the spruce-fir conifer forests and open habitat of the Gulf Coastal Plain. Although scarce, this contrast of habitats highlights the adaptability of Arctodus simus. At the Rainbow River and Lake Rousseau localities in Rancholabrean Florida, three Arctodus simus specimens have been recovered, alongside Smilodon, dire wolves, jaguars, ground sloths (Paramylodon, Megalonyx), llamas (Palaeolama, Hemiauchenia), Vero's tapir,  giant beaver, capybara, Holmesina, horses, Bison antiquus, mastodon, Colombian mammoths and Tremarctos floridanus, in a climate similar to today's. That one of the three individuals was a very large, older specimen establishes extreme sexual dimorphism as the explanation behind size differences in Arctodus simus. Furthermore, the abundance of black bears, and particularly Florida short faced bears in Florida, has led to a theorized niche partitioning of ursids in Florida, with Tremarctos floridanus being herbivorous, and black bears and Arctodus simus being omnivorous, with Arctodus being possibly more inclined towards carnivory.

In the Black Belt of Late Pleistocene Mississippi, a terrestrial floodplain at Cedar Creek hosted a mixture of grassland and mixed woodlands adapted species (including Arctodus simus). Horses, then bison, are the most numerous of the fauna, but were also joined by Colombian mammoths, coyotes, Dasypus bellus and Holmesina on the plains. Mastodon, ground sloths (Eremotherium, Megalonyx), peccaries (Platygonus, Mylohylus), deer (Cervus, Odocoileus), lynx, black bear, Florida short-faced bear, margays, gray fox, Hemiauchenia, turkeys and racoons in the open woodlands, with giant beavers, lesser beavers, and capybara inhabiting the marshes. Coyotes and black bears from this locality are unusually small for the Late Pleistocene. Further west, in the Mississippi Alluvial Plain, the fauna Arctodus simus encountered at the Bar, Arkansas was similar to Saltville, Virginia, with the addition of Paleolama, Bison, Mylohyus, black bears, tapirs, manatees and alligator snapping turtles. During the Last Glacial Maximum, in part due to glacial meltwaters producing a cold microclimate, boreal forests extended from 40° N to coastal regions near 23° N. Mississippi's boreal forests were dominated by pine, spruce, ash, aspen, oak and hickory, with more deciduous trees and herbs/grasses in the lowlands. However, the presence of the giant tortoise, Hesperotestudo crassiscutata, in both localities is indicative of mild winters, and limited seasonality. Arctodus, along with Colombian mammoths, seems to have avoided the coastal savannas of the south east, where Mixotoxodon was present. Additional finds of south-eastern Arctodus simus are from Alabama, South Carolina. and Texas.

 Canada 

The vast majority of Canada was glaciated during the Late Pleistocene. However, southern Alberta may have been spared, providing a tundra ecosystem (at least until the Last Glacial Maximum). Arctodus simus remains have been recovered from the mid-Wisconsian (~22,000 BP) near Edmonton, forming a predator guild with the gray wolf and American lion. Also present were Megalonyx, horses (E. conversidens & E. niobrarensis), caribou, camels, mammoths (Colombian and woolly), mastodon, bison (B. priscus & B. latifrons), and oxen (Ovibos & Bootherium). The higher diversity of grazers to browsers suggested a more open environment- that the American lion individual was noticeably smaller than its southern contemporaries contrasts with the huge Arctodus and large wolf specimens.

The entry to the ice-free corridor to Beringia may have also been near Edmonton, providing a migration pathway to Beringia. Arctodus remains from similar habitat has also been recovered from Saskatchewan, and from the forest-steppe of Late Pleistocene Vancouver Island. Arctodus was a scarce member of the Pleistocene fauna of southern Canada- extant herbivorous bears are browsers, not grazers, so the scarcity of Arctodus in mid-latitude North America may be due to a lack of suitable vegetation on the steppe. On the other hand, should Arctodus simus have been a large and strict carnivore, perhaps Arctodus simus would never have been very numerous in an open ecosystem.

 Beringia 

Mostly isolated by the Cordilleran and Laurentide ice sheets, Beringia is considered ecologically separate to the rest of North America, being largely an extension of the Eurasian mammoth steppe. However, due to the occasional opening of an ice-free corridor, and the migration barrier of the Beringian gap, meant that Eastern Beringia (Alaska and the Yukon) supported a unique assemblage of fauna, with many endemic North American fauna flourishing (such as Arctodus simus) within a mostly Beringian ecosystem. This mostly open and treeless steppe-tundra, dominated by grasses, sedges, Artemisia spp., and a range of other forbs had a cold, dry climate, which prevented glaciation. Currently, all specimens of A. simus in Beringia have been dated to a 27,000 year window (50,000 BP~23,000 BP) from Eastern Beringia. However, additional undated remains may be of Sangamonian age. The largest skull of A. simus known was recovered from the Yukon, and may represent the largest specimen known.

The North Slope of Alaska <40,000 BP (Ikpikpuk and Titaluk rivers) preserves an upland and floodplain environment, with horses, bison then caribou being the most populous herbivores, and woolly mammoths, muskoxen, elk and saiga antelope more scarce. Cave lions, bears (Ursus arctos and Arctodus simus), and Beringian wolves made up the megafaunal predator guild. That caribou and muskox utilized the warmer, wetter portions of the regional vegetation mosaic (similar to the moist acidic tundra vegetation which dominates today), while horse, bison, and mammoth were dryland specialists, may reflect the preferred habitat of Arctodus, as isotope data suggests caribou and muskox were principal components of the carnivorous portion of Beringian Arctodus simus' diet.

Additionally, upon the flooding of the Bering Strait and expansion of peatlands in Eastern Beringia during MIS-3, lions, brown bears and Homotherium went regionally extinct ~35,000 BP, whereas Arctodus persisted. Simultaneously, muskox, bison, non-caballine horses (Haringtonhippus) and other megafaunal herbivores in Beringia experienced population bottlenecks in MIS-3, whilst mammoth populations steadily declined. This restriction of prey and habitat could explain the extinctions. However, genetically distinct Panthera spelaea and brown bears appear in MIS-2 circa the extinction of Arctodus in a re-emerged Beringia ~23,000 BP (possibly due to sharp climatic cooling associated with Heinrich Event-2), opening up the possibility that some level of competition was at play. The idea that Arctodus had a kleptoparasitic relationship with wolves and Homotherium in Beringia has been explored, and with the additional possibility that Arctodus restricted brown bears and Homotherium access to caribou pre-LGM.

Not only did Arctodus likely compete at a higher trophic level than the majority of brown bears in Beringia, Arctodus' nitrogen-15 levels are higher in the Yukon, suggesting that Arctodus possibly occupied an even higher trophic level there relative to other Arctodus in Beringia. However, isotope differences more likely reflect subtle differences in the isotopic composition of primary producers in the region.

It would be reasonable to assume that meat and bone marrow were likely to be the primary food resources for some northern populations of A. simus, in which the survival during the cold season could have depended on the regular scavenging of ungulate carcasses, as is the case with Alaskan brown bears. Ultimately, an opportunistic foraging strategy including up to 50% vegetation, and the meat of reindeer, muskox, carrion, and possibly some predators, is consistent with the isotopic data and the conclusions of the ecomorphological studies.

 Discussions regarding diet 
 "Super predator" hypothesis 

One past proposal, suggested by Björn Kurtén, envisaged A. simus as a brutish predator that overwhelmed the megafauna of the Pleistocene with its great physical strength. However, despite being very large, its limbs were too gracile for such an attack strategy, significantly more gracile so than Arctotherium angustidens at that.

Due to their long legs, an alternative hypothesis is that it may have hunted by running down Pleistocene herbivores such as wild horses and saiga antelopes, and even prey such as mammoths, an idea that at one time earned it the name "running bear". However, during pursuit of speedy game animals, the bear's sheer physical mass and plantigrade gait would be a handicap; modern brown bears can run at the same speed but quickly tire and cannot keep up a chase for long. Arctodus skeletons do not articulate in a way that would have allowed for quick turns – an ability required of any predator that survives by chasing down agile prey.

Moreover, the morphology of the lumbar vertebrae of Arctodus limited acceleration, as it does in the brown bear. The vertebral spines of Arctodus were tight & rectangular, with no leverage for the intertransversarial muscles to flex the vertebral column. Subsequently, a limited capacity for flexion and extension in the sagittal plane likely led to a lower maximal running speed. Combined with proportionally taller legs, a short trunk, and proportionally small and laterally-orientated eyes, ambush hunting was an unlikely lifestyle for Arctodus.

However, analysis of the forelimb of Arctodus suggests the bear could have been in the early stages of cursorial evolution-  A. simus was somewhat more prone to cursorial tendencies, being capable of more efficient locomotion, A. simus was interpreted as capable of high-speed (relative to extant bears), straight-line locomotion, and was likely more adept at pursuing large prey than the extant polar and brown bears. However, that the limbs are elongated in the proximal rather than distal limb segments, had a plantigrade gait, and a stride which had little to no unsupported intervals, put doubt to this theory. Moreover, the pronation of the forearm and the flexion of the wrist and digits, and more lightly muscled forelimbs, all of which are crucial to grasping a large prey animal with the forepaws, were probably less powerful in Arctodus than in either the brown bear or in Panthera.Ultimately, the lack of specialized predatory adaptions (such as the absence of laterally compressed canines, and carnassials built for crushing and grinding rather than shearing meat) puts doubt to any species-wide hyper-carnivorous interpretations of Arctodus. Although the only extant hyper-carnivorous ursid, the polar bear, also lacks carnassial shears, the species' primary subsistence on blubber rather than coarser flesh may negate the need to evolve dentition specialised in processing meat (the polar bear's recent evolution notwithstanding).

 Specialist kleptoparasite vs Omnivore 

The idea that Arctodus was a kleptoparasite was most notably proposed by Paul Matheus. Under this model, A. simus was ill-equipped to be an active predator, having evolved as a specialized scavenger adapted to cover an extremely large home range in order to seek out broadly and unevenly distributed mega-mammal carcasses. There would have been additional selective pressure for increased body size, so that Arctodus could procure and defend carcasses from other large carnivores, some of which were gregarious, or chase them from their kills and steal their food. Furthermore, the short rostrum, resulting in increased out-forces of the jaw-closing muscles (temporalis and masseter), may have been an adaptation for cracking bones with their broad carnassials. Such use of the P4 and m1 teeth is supported by the heavy wear on these teeth in old individuals of Arctodus simus and Agriotherium (another giant bear). Moreover, at least in Beringia, the conservative growth strategies, long lives and low natural mortality rates of horses and mammoths should have provided somewhat evenly distributed carcasses throughout the year (unlike ruminants such as bison, whose mortality peaks in late winter to early spring). Additionally, that the tooth fracture frequencies of dire wolves, saber-toothed cats, and American lions from Rancho La Brea were recorded at three times the frequency of comparative extant large carnivores, competition was more intense during the Late Pleistocene, and therefore suggesting species both scavenged more actively, and utilized carcasses more fully. Finally, that Arctodus and the cave hyena did not spread into North America and Siberia respectively suggests some form of competitive exclusion was at play (although many other fauna did not cross the Beringian gap, such as ground sloths and the woolly rhino).

This idea was challenged by a comprehensive review by paleontologist Borja Figueirido and colleagues in 2010, a 2013 study of the micro-wear of the teeth of various extant and extinct bears (examining Arctodus specimens from La Brea), and a 2015 study focusing on carnivorans recovered from Rancho La Brea. Specialized scavengers like hyenas show distinctive patterns of molar damage from cracking bones. Based on lack of "bone-cracking" wear in specimens from Rancho La Brea, researchers concluded that Arctodus simus was not a specialized scavenger. Of living bears, this population of A. simus showed the most similar tooth wear patterns to its closest living relative, the spectacled bear, which can have a highly varied diet- from obligate omnivory to, on the most part, being almost purely herbivorous in diet. However, this depends on the region, and seasonal availability. Additionally, the higher rates of tooth breakage at La Brea were revisited, and due to a relative lack of bone related microwear on other carnivorans (even lower than the modern day) was attributed to the hunting of larger prey, and the acquisition and/or defense of kills. Moreover, severe tooth crown fractures and alveolar infections were found in the South American giant short faced bear (Arctotherium angustidens). These were interpreted as evidence of feeding on tough materials (e.g. bones), which could tentatively indicate for these bears the regular scavenging of ungulate carcasses obtained through kleptoparasitism. However, such dental pathologies were not observed in the specimens of A. simus, other than the strong wear facets of old individuals. Additionally, the short, broad rostrum of Arctodus is a characteristic also shared with the sun bear and the spectacled bear, which are both omnivorous. Moreover, isotope analyses of Beringian Arctodus specimens suggest that Arctodus had a low consumption rate of horses and mammoths in Beringia, despite those species making up ~50% of the available biomass in Beringia.

Furthermore, the relative lack of Arctodus remains at predator traps such as the La Brea Tar Pits, suggests that Arctodus did not compete for carcasses. Although La Brea has produced more Arctodus simus specimens than any other site (presumably due to the quality of preservation with tar), they are only 1% of all carnivorans in the pits, which is a similar rate to brown bears and black bears, both omnivorous ursids which lean towards herbivory. As only two specimens were located from the Natural Trap Cave in Wyoming by 1993, a similar rate (~0.9%) of relative abundance was calculated for Arctodus compared to other megafauna at the site. Dental pathologies which have been found, such as incisor wear & supragingival dental calculus in a young individual, and cavities associated with carbohydrate consumption in individuals from La Brea, further suggest an omnivorous diet for Arctodus simus. Further evidence comes from the evolution of brain size relative to body size- ursids which do not exhibit dormancy and have a high caloric diet, showed a weak but significant correlation with bigger relative brain size. Arctodus simus plotted in between the likely hypercarnivorous Cephalogale, and the obligately herbivorous Eurasian cave bear and Indarctos, suggesting omnivory.

 Herbivory 

The fact that Arctodus did not significantly differ in dentition or build from modern bears has led most authors to support the hypothesis that the A. simus and the cave bear were omnivores, like most modern bears, and the former would have eaten plants depending on availability. Morphologically, Arctodus simus exhibits characteristics common to herbivorous bears. This includes cheek teeth with large surface areas, a deep mandible, and large mandibular muscle attachments (which are rare in carnivorous mammals). Because herbivorous carnivorans lack an efficient digestive tract for breaking down plant matter via microbial action, they must break down plant matter via extensive chewing or grinding, and thus possess features to create a high mechanical advantage of the jaw.

While features of Arctodus simus morphology suggest herbivory, their close phylogenetic relationship to the omni-herbivorous spectacled bear presents the possibility that these traits may be an ancestral condition of the group. Regardless, gross tooth wear suggests consumption of at least some plant matter in the diet of Arctodus simus at La Brea. Despite presumed variety in the diet of Arctodus simus, the diet of individuals from La Brea were likely less generalized than modern black bear, based on the consistency of Arctodus' tooth wear. Fossils of bear coprolites found in association with Arctodus remains at The Mammoth Site in South Dakota are believed to contain Juniperus seeds.

 Studies 
Paleontologists Steven Emslie and Nicholas Czaplewski suggested that the body size of Arctodus simus exceeded the expected upper limitations for a Quaternary terrestrial carnivore (based on the more restrictive energy base for a carnivorous diet). This size discrepancy, along with a dentition akin to Tremarctos ornatus, indicated a primarily herbivorous diet, but with the potential for opportunistic carnivory. This was challenged by a 1988 study, specifically on the basis of Arctodus' skull and body proportions being an impediment to foraging (especially in open areas), and the abundance of contemporary large prey. In particular, despite cranial adaptions strongly aligning with herbivory, a browsing diet foraged from the canopies of trees and shrubs could have been difficult with the large and flattened rostrum and incisor arcade of Arctodus. However, the gracility and lack of agility of Arctodus would have also complicated predation upon adult mega-herbivores, and hindered the chasing down of nimbler prey. Additionally, studies of mandibular morphology and tooth microwear of bears confirms that short faced bears such as the spectacled bear and Arctodus were adapted to and actively consumed vegetation, whereas Ursus is omnivorous.

A 2006 study by Sorkin found dental and cranial adaptations for herbivory present in Arctodus simus, suggest that the diet of the Arctodus included a large amount of plant material. Their cranial adaptations for increased bite force (including the short rostrum), broad muzzles (which would have precluded selective browsing), and the absence of digging adaptations in their forelimbs and claws (which would have limited rooting) suggest that the plant material in their diet was coarse foliage, which was unselectively grazed.  A 2010 study analyzing the mandibular morphology of Arctodus simus noted that the similarity of A. simus with the herbivorous Tremarctos ornatus is likely due to both a mandible shape which housed more primitive characteristics relative to other bears, and a convergence in dietary adaptations towards herbivory. This was found not only in the overall shape of the jaw, but also a strong premasseteric fossa, interpreted as an adaptation for strong chewing activity.

 Opportunistic carnivory 
Although evidence suggests that Arctodus also consumed meat, studies establish that isotope data cannot differentiate between hypercarnivores and omnivores which consume significant amounts of animal matter.

 Carbon isotope studies 
Evidence from the carbon isotope values of an Arctodus simus individual from Cedral, San Luis Potosí, México, suggested that Arctodus simus from this locality preferred areas of closed vegetation. Owing to having only one sample of Arctodus simus from Cedral and the lack of nitrogen isotopic values, the study found it difficult to infer whether Arctodus simus was an omnivore or hypercarnivore. The δ13C value, however, showed that this individual fed upon C3 resources- in fact, that Arctodus individual had the strongest δ13C value of the fauna studied. Arctodus' carbon isotope value did not overlap with, but was closest to values from the tapir and Hemiauchenia. Those animals could have been included in their diet, along with other contemporaneous C3 herbivores such as camels, peccaries, Shasta ground sloth and mastodon, along with C3 vegetation.

For specimens from inland California (Fairmead Landfill) from the Middle Pleistocene, a 2012 study proposed that Arctodus simus consumed Colombian mammoth, and large ungulates- that Arctodus likely consumed substantial amounts of vegetation made conclusive determinations unclear. However, the author republished in 2015 with colleagues, recalibrating Arctodus' δ13C values to be closest to C3 vegetation consuming Cervus and Mammut, if the consumption of C3 vegetation by Arctodus is not included. In the later Californian McKittrick Tar Pits, Arctodus simus had a diet which included deer and tapir, similar to the one inferred for the Cedral individual. Alaskan specimens were thought to also largely predate upon similar megafauna as proposed for the Fairmead individuals in the 2012 study, but isotope data suggests reindeer, muskox and possibly fellow predators and their kills, were regularly consumed.

A single find from the Channel Islands of California replete with nitrogen isotope signatures aligning with bison and camels (followed by seals) bolsters the suggestion that although not entirely carnivorous, A. simus would have had a flexible diet across its range. That the Arctodus fossil in the Channel Islands was likely transported post-mortem from mainland California further complicates the idea of a standard diet for Arctodus, as the mainland would have had plenty of vegetation to consume. However, the partial reliance on marine resources has been suggested to be as a result of a competitive megafaunal carnivore guild- the marine signal was in between island foxes and bald eagles, most closely resembling Late Pleistocene California condors.

 Bone damage 
The bite marks found on many bones of ground sloths (Northrotheriops texanus) and young proboscideans at Leisey Shell Pit in Florida matched the size of the canine teeth of Arctodus pristinus. It is not known if these bite marks are the result of active predation or scavenging.Arctodus simus has been found in association with proboscidean remains near Frankstown, Pennsylvania (juvenile mastodon), and at The Mammoth Site, South Dakota (Columbian mammoths). However, questions remain as to whether these finds determine a predatory or scavenging relationship, or whether they were simply preserved at the same deposit. On the other hand, a woolly mammoth specimen from Saltville, Virginia was likely scavenged on by Arctodus simus, as evidenced by a canine gouge through the calcaneus. Several Columbian mammoth bones from a cave near Huntington Reservoir, Utah also record ursid gnaw marks attributed to Arctodus, with an Arctodus specimen preserved in association with the remains. A mastodon humerus from the Snowmastodon site in Colorado bears tooth marks also suggested to be from Arctodus.

Importantly, the canines of Panthera atrox overlap in size with Arctodus simus, complicating the identification of tooth marks. However, this is not to discredit all tooth marks attributed to Arctodus, as damaged bones from an Arctodus den site in Alaska suggest that Arctodus transported megafaunal longbones back to a cave-like den and chewed on them, at a time when lions had a limited overlap with Arctodus in Beringia. Furthermore, a perforated peccary ilium from Sheriden Cave has also been hypothesised as being scavenged by Arctodus simus. Bone damage on a cranial fragment (and possibly the humerus) of an Arctodus individual in a cave on Vancouver Island has been attributed to another Arctodus, on the basis that Arctodus was the only confirmed large terrestrial carnivoran at the locality.

 Beringia 
Analysis of bones from Alaska showed high concentrations of nitrogen-15, a stable nitrogen isotope accumulated by carnivores. Additionally, although few specimens exist, there is currently no evidence of the same carbohydrate-related dental pathologies evident in southern populations of Arctodus simus. Based on this evidence, A. simus was suggested to have been more carnivorous in Beringia than the rest of North America (with a preference for herbivores which consumed C3 vegetation, particularly caribou). A 2015 study suggests that caribou could not account for the high levels of carbon-13 and nitrogen-15 in some Arctodus individuals in Beringia. The study suggests that the consumption of tundra muskox, which sometimes express high proportions of these isotopes, and possibly other predators in its Beringian range, may explain the data.  Increased carnivory may be due to a lower proportion of competitors and probably a lower availability of carbohydrate-rich food supplies across the year in the far northern latitudes.

Assuming a hyper-carnivorous diet, a  Beringian Arctodus would need to consume ~ of meat per year- the equivalent of 12 bison, 44.6 caballine horses, or 2 woolly mammoths (adjusted for the non-edible portions of the body). Therefore, Arctodus would have had to obtain  of flesh/edible carrion every 6.25 days ( per day).

Studies point out that A. simus would have had a varied diet across its range, and that the features of the skull and teeth match modern omnivorous bears. Additionally, the isotope data purportedly establishing the carnivory of Beringian Arctodus overlapped with modern, omni-herbivorous brown bears from Europe, eastern Wyoming, and central Montana, demonstrating that isotope data cannot distinguish between hypercarnivores and omnivores which eat a significant amount of animal matter. However, this has been challenged on the basis that herbivory should be more obvious in the data gathered from Arctodus.

Regardless, the local extinction of Arctodus in Beringia ~23,000 BP, much earlier than in other parts of its range, raises questions about how suited Arctodus was to a hypothetically carnivorous niche, and why, whilst recolonized by cave lions and brown bears, Arctodus didn't repopulate Beringia once the ice-free corridor to the south re-opened later in the Pleistocene.

 Human interaction 
One documented interaction with Clovis people is present at the Lubbock Lake Landmark, Texas. A likely already deceased Arctodus simus was processed for subsistence (butchery marks indicated skinning, de-fleshing and disarticulation) and technology (raw material resource for tool production), much in the same way as a mammoth carcass (~13,000 BP / 11,100 14C BP ). Additionally, other remains of the Arctodus simus have been found in association with Paleo-Indian artifacts in Sheriden Cave, Ohio, and Huntington Dam, Utah. It is clear that people were at least occasionally involved in the death and/or butchery of several different large non-carnivorous Pleistocene mammals, particularly mammoths and mastodons. This may at times have put people in competition with Arctodus simus for carcasses, and possibly for prey. Defense against these large bears as well as abandonment of carcasses are plausible outcomes. The relationship between people and Arctodus simus is likely to have been uneasy at best.

 Migration barrier hypothesis 
In the late 1980s, Val Geist hypothesized that humans, along with other Siberian megafauna such as moose and brown bears, to have found Arctodus, along with other "specialist, aggressive, competitive Rancholabrean fauna" a barrier to migrating into North America (both Beringia and below the ice sheets). Male A. simus were the largest and most powerful carnivorous land mammals in North America, with the potential specialization in obtaining and dominating distant and scarce resources. Humans in this hypothesis, though familiar with brown bears, would not have been able to effectively contend with the Arctodus simus and other large Pleistocene carnivores, a situation that would have suppressed human population expansion. However, this has been discredited by modern research- evidence continues to maintain a prolonged co-existence of humans and Arctodus across North America.

 Beringia 

Humans migrated to North America via the Siberian mammoth steppe, arriving at Eastern Beringia (Alaska and the Yukon). However, the migration was halted at the North American Ice Sheet, which separated Beringia and southern North America for most of the Late Pleistocene. Both humans and Arctodus are first dated to ~50,000 BP in Beringia, both from sites in the Yukon, and co-existed until Arctodus went extinct in Beringia ~23,000 BP during the Last Glacial Maximum. This co-existence was despite the regional extinction of other Beringian predators such as lions, brown bears and saber-tooth cats. Important sites of pre-LGM human occupation in Beringia include the Old Crow Flats, Kuparuk River Valley & the Bluefish Caves.

 Contiguous North America 
Additionally, the human colonization of North America south of the ice sheets further disproves the idea that Arctodus was a migration barrier. Pre-LGM sites across the Americas such Chiquihuite Cave, Valsequillo, El Cedral, Calico, Hartley Mammoth Site, Pendejo Cave and White Sands suggest that humans co-existed with Arctodus for many thousands, if not tens of thousands of years. This extensive overlap with Arctodus across North America puts significant doubt to the migration barrier hypothesis.

The earliest universally accepted post LGM/pre-Clovis site is Monte Verde in Chile, dated to ~15,000 BP. Similarly dated sites from Saltville, La Sena, Meadowcroft, Topper, Triquet Island, Cactus Hill, and Buttermilk Creek in the USA further solidify a rapid human expansion across the Americas despite competitive pressure.

 Extinction Arctodus simus went extinct around 12,000 years ago, which is relatively late when compared to other victims of the Quaternary extinction event. Arctodus was also one of the last (16 out of 35) North American megafauna to go extinct, having reached the Pleistocene-Holocene boundary (13,800 BP - 11,400 BP). Various factors, including the depletion in number of large herbivores, the diminishing nutritional quality of plants during climate change, and competition with fellow omnivores (humans and brown bears) for food resources, have been suggested as the cause of Arctodus simus' extinction. However, multiple studies put doubt on brown bears being culpable in Arctodus simus' extinction. Moreover, there is no strong evidence that humans hunted large extinct Pleistocene carnivores in North America, and no clear indication of direct human involvement in the extinction of Arctodus simus. Additionally, dental wear evidence from Rancho La Brea does not suggest that food shortages were to blame for the demise of Arctodus simus, or other large bodied carnivorans.

 Climate change 
Of the factors discussed, vegetation shifts in the latest Pleistocene may have been particularly unfavorable for Arctodus simus, due to a reduction of quality foraging for subsistence. For example, on Vancouver Island (∼13,500 BP), vegetation changed rapidly from open woodlands with abundant lodgepole pine to increasingly closed forests with shade-tolerant spruce, mountain hemlock, and red alder. These changes, effective by ∼12,450 BP, point toward cool and moist conditions during the Younger Dryas stadial. Closed forests continued to expand in the early Holocene, with western hemlock becoming dominant. Even though Arctodus simus was not restricted to open areas and could occur in different environments, the timing of the regional shift from an open pine woodland habitat to a densely forested vegetation implies that these vegetation changes contributed to the local extirpation of Arctodus simus, along with many other megafauna.

 Low genetic diversity 
Loss and turnover of the diversity of mitochondrial DNA before the Last Glacial Maximum has been noted amongst Eurasian and American megafauna such as bison, lions, horses and mammoths. This is predicated by a decrease in population size from a previously genetically diverse population in the Late Pleistocene, followed by either a repopulation from a source population, or extinction at the start of the Holocene. Correspondingly, Arctodus simus had a very low level of genetic diversity from most sampled specimens, albeit a sample with a Beringian and temporal bias (<44,000 BP). A reduced ability to adapt to environmental conditions has been attributed to a lack of genetic diversity, and this combination has contributed to the endangerment of modern specialized carnivores such as lions and Tasmanian devils. That the individual from Sheriden Cave, Ohio was very closely related to Beringian specimens further may support this idea, as these populations had possibly been isolated from before the Last Glacial Maximum (tens of thousands of years). A similar level of genetic affinity between Beringian fauna and some southern populations has been found in contemporary camels and horses.

Small population sizes may also be characteristic of tremarctine bears- the spectacled bear, while having low levels of genetic diversity, has no signs of a recent genetic bottleneck. However, brown bears, along with many recently immigrated taxa, had diverse, sympatric source populations in Eurasia, allowing for repopulations/reinvasions into the Americas. If Arctodus simus experienced genetic bottlenecks or local extinctions prior to the Last Glacial Maximum, Arctodus would have been unable to supplement their reduced genetic diversity with new migrants like the brown bear could, making them vulnerable to extinction.

 Last dates 
The youngest date for Arctodus simus is circa 12,700 BP from Friesenhahn Cave, Texas, calibrated from 10,814 ± 55 radiocarbon years (14C BP). However, this date should be viewed with caution, as analyses suggest the collagen protein was degraded. A vertebra from Bonner Springs, Kansas, was dated to ca. 12,800 BP (based on 10,921 ± 50 radiocarbon years) from well preserved collagen. However, another radiocarbon date from a different laboratory on the same vertebra widens the possible age of the vertebra to between 9,510 and 11,021 14C BP (at 2σ). Nevertheless, a specimen from Huntington Dam, Utah was also dated to ca. 12,800 BP from two radiocarbon dates (10,870 ± 75 & 10,976 ± 40 14C BP) and is therefore considered reliable.

See also
 Arctotherium Agriotherium''
 Pleistocene megafauna
 Quaternary Extinction Event

References

Pleistocene bears
Pleistocene carnivorans
Pleistocene extinctions
Prehistoric mammals of North America
Pleistocene mammals of North America
Extinct animals of the United States
Extinct animals of Mexico
Fossil taxa described in 1854
Apex predators